The 2025 NFL Draft will be the 90th annual meeting of National Football League (NFL) franchises to select newly eligible players. The draft is scheduled to be held in a yet to be determined location.

Trades involving draft picks
In the explanations below (PD) indicates trades completed prior to the start of the draft (i.e. Pre–Draft), while (D) denotes trades that took place during the 2025 draft.

Round 2
Carolina → Chicago (PD). Carolina traded a second-round selection, wide receiver D. J. Moore, 2023 first- and second-round selections (9th and 61st overall), and a 2024 first-round selection to Chicago in exchange for a 2023 first-round selection (1st overall).

Round 3

Round 4

Round 5
Denver → Miami (PD). Denver traded Bradley Chubb and a 2025 fifth-round selection to Miami in exchange for its 2023 first-round and 2024 fourth-round selections, and running back Chase Edmonds.

Round 6
Pittsburgh → Washington (PD). Pittsburgh traded a conditional sixth-round selection to Washington in exchange for cornerback William Jackson III and a conditional seventh-round selection.

Round 7
Arizona → Carolina  (PD). Arizona traded a seventh-round selection and a 2024 sixth-round selection to Carolina in exchange for wide receiver Robbie Anderson.
New Orleans → Philadelphia (PD). New Orleans traded safety C. J. Gardner-Johnson and a seventh-round selection to Philadelphia in exchange for a 2023 fifth-round selection and 2024 sixth-round selection.
Pittsburgh → Minnesota (PD). Pittsburgh traded a conditional seventh-round selection to Minnesota in exchange for offensive guard Jesse Davis.
Washington → Pittsburgh (PD). See Round 6: Pittsburgh → Washington.

2020 Resolution JC-2A picks
Since the 2021 draft, the league, under 2020 Resolution JC-2A passed in November 2020, rewards teams for developing minority candidates for head coach and/or general manager positions. The resolution rewards teams whose minority candidates are hired away for one of those positions by awarding draft picks. These draft picks are at the end of the third round, after standard compensatory picks; if multiple teams qualify, they are awarded by draft order in the first round. These picks are in addition to, and have no impact on, the standard 32 compensatory picks. One pick was awarded for the 2025 draft pursuant to the resolution.

San Francisco received a third-round selection after Houston hired former 49ers defensive coordinator DeMeco Ryans as head coach.

References
Trade references

General references

National Football League Draft
NFL Draft
NFL Draft